

Seeds
A champion seed is indicated in bold text while text in italics indicates the round in which that seed was eliminated.

  Carlos Moyà (first round)
  Àlex Corretja (final)
  Álbert Costa (first round)
  Dominik Hrbatý (semifinals)
  Francisco Clavet (quarterfinals)
  Fernando Vicente (first round)
  Rainer Schüttler (second round)
  Franco Squillari (second round)

Draw

External links
 1999 Majorca Open draw

Singles